Guardians is the debut studio album by American metalcore band The Crimson Armada. The album was released on July 7, 2009.

Music videos
The Crimson Armada released a video for the song "The Serpents Tongue", produced by Thunder Down. The video begins with the band playing inside a home then going to a woman sorting photos. Meanwhile, a member of the 82nd Airborne wanders in Normandy during WWII, he is ambushed by German soldiers and shot. After a few more scenes of the band, the man begins to read a letter, he then dies. At that time the woman then begins to sprout angel wings. She then appears with the soldier in Normandy. She touches him and his eyes open again as she smiles. The video ends with her putting his photo (which used to have the eyes covered) down into a pile with other photos.

Track listing

Personnel
The Crimson Armada
 Saud Ahmed – lead vocals, keyboards, synthesizers, piano, programming
 Kyle Barrington – lead guitar
 Dan Hatfield – rhythm guitar
 Chris Yates – bass guitar
 David Puckett – drums

Additional personnel
 Mattie Montgomery – additional vocals on track 6
 Joey Sturgis – production, additional vocals on track 8

References

2009 debut albums
The Crimson Armada albums
Metal Blade Records albums
Albums produced by Joey Sturgis